Nurabad-e Yek (also Romanized as Nūrābād-e Yek; also known as Nūrābād) is a village in Nakhlestan Rural District, in the Central District of Kahnuj County, Kerman Province, Iran. At the 2006 census, its population was 929, in 176 families.

References 

Populated places in Kahnuj County